List of journalists killed during the War in Afghanistan (2001–2021)  accounts for journalists killed while reporting about the war.

Afghanistan

See also
 War in Afghanistan (2001–present)
 Human rights in Afghanistan

References

External links
 The Journalists Memorial

 
Afghanistan
Killed
Journalists killed